Roshni Haripriyan better known as Roshini (born 30 November 1990) is an Indian actress and model who predominantly appears in Tamil TV serials and films. She is known for playing the lead in the Tamil-language television series Bharathi Kannamma. In 2022, she was a contestant on the reality cooking series Cooku with Comali (season 3).

Roshini was also nominated and listed by The Times of India as Most Desirable Women on Indian Television for both 2019 and 2020.

Early life 
Roshini was born to her parents Haripriyan (father) and Amala (mother) on 14 August 1991 in Chennai, Tamil Nadu. She did her Schooling at St Mary’s Matriculation Girls Higher Secondary School, Chennai and completed her degree in human biology from Ethiraj College for Women, Chennai.

Career 
Roshini made her debut into television in 2019 by first debuting in the soap opera Bharathi Kannamma which aired on Star Vijay playing the lead character role known as Kannamma. However in 2021, she announced a sudden drop out from the cast since she accepted a major offer to appear in a film which would mark her film debut and hence was replaced by actress Vinusha Devi. However besides television, Roshini also appeared in many advertisements and short films. In 2022, she also appeared in the cooking show Cooku with Comali (season 3), however she was eliminated from the show just before the finale took place. She has also appeared in various different Tamil music videos.

Media 
In 2019 and 2020 two years in a row, Roshini was listed in The Times of Indias Top 20 Most Desirable Women on Indian Television.

Filmography

Television

Music videos

Films

Accolades

See also 
 List of Indian television actresses

References

External links 

Living people
Tamil television actresses
Actresses in Tamil television
Actresses in Tamil cinema
Indian television actresses
Indian soap opera actresses
21st-century Indian actresses
Indian female models
1992 births